Ivana Mitrović (born 3 February 1993) is a Serbian handball player who plays for ŽORK Jagodina and the Serbia national team

Achievements 
Serbian First League:
Winner: 2017/2018, 2018/2019

Individual awards 
 Serbian First League Top Scorer: season 2017/2018
 Serbian First League MVP season 2018/2019

References 
 

     
Living people
1993 births
Serbian female handball players
People from Bor, Serbia